The list of shipwrecks in 1999 includes ships sunk, foundered, grounded, or otherwise lost during 1999.

January

6 January

8 January

11 January

15 January

18 January

21 January

30 January

February

3 February

4 February

10 February

18 February

22 February

March

12 March

18 March

April

20 April

May

8 May

9 May

13 May

17 May

20 May

Unknown date

June

6 June

15 June

16 June

17 June

30 June

July

7 July

13 July

14 July

19 July

Unknown date

August

14 August

24 August

25 August

September

2 September

4 September

13 September

19 September

23 September

October

1 October

18 October

20 October

21 October

30 October

31 October

November

2 November

3 November

5 November

7 November

12 November

18 November

24 November

26 November

December

3 December

9 December

12 December

23 December

29 December

31 December

Unknown date

References

1999
 
Ship